The Mayor of Gjilan  is the head of the City of Gjilan (city in Republic of Kosovo). The mayor acts on behalf of the City, and performs an executive function in the City of Gjilan. The majority of population is Albanian, but there are also smaller communities including Bosniaks, Serbs, Romani and others. The surface of Gjilan is 392 km². Gjilan is known as the center of cultural, economical developments. Since 2013 the current Mayor is Lutfi Haziri.

Office
According to the current legislation, the Mayor is elected along with members of the City Assembly at the direct secret ballot for the period of four years. The Mayor may not be a councilor of the City Assembly.

List of mayors

References 

Gjilan
Mayors of places in Kosovo